Aphoebantus is a genus of bee flies (insects in the family Bombyliidae). There are at least 80 described species in Aphoebantus.

Species

References

Further reading

External links

 
 

Bombyliidae genera